Pasquale "Pat" Mastroianni (born December 22, 1971) is a Canadian actor. He is best known for his role as Joey Jeremiah in the Degrassi franchise, for which he received a Gemini Award in 1988.

Biography 
Mastroianni grew up in Toronto, the son of Angela and Angelo Mastroianni. He is of Italian heritage. He later recalled that he had first heard about the audition of Degrassi over his school's PA system.

Mastroianni was among the cast of Degrassi that were named UNICEF Goodwill Ambassadors by the Ontario branch of UNICEF Canada in 1989. Along with cast member Amanda Stepto, Mastroianni visited the Headquarters of the United Nations in New York City.

After Degrassi High ended in 1992, Mastroianni worked as a waiter and a paver in his father's construction business, and gave up college for acting when his university mandated that he devote all his time to his studies. He had roles in several Canadian productions, including Liberty Street and Music Works. Though he was quoted as saying in 1998 that there was "very little" chance of a Degrassi sequel, Degrassi: The Next Generation began in 2001, where Mastroianni reprised his role as Joey for five seasons.

Mastroianni was a guest star on the supernatural medical drama Saving Hope.

Mastroianni continues acting and living in Toronto.

Filmography

Film

Television

References

External links 
 

1971 births
Living people
20th-century Canadian male actors
21st-century Canadian male actors
Best Actor in a Drama Series Canadian Screen Award winners
Canadian male film actors
Canadian male television actors
Canadian people of Italian descent
Male actors from Toronto
UNICEF Goodwill Ambassadors